Junius Moore Horner (July 7, 1859 – April 5, 1933) was the first bishop of the Diocese of Western North Carolina in The Episcopal Church.

Early life and education
Horner was born on July 7, 1859, in Oxford, North Carolina, the son of James Hunter Horner and Sophronia Moore. Horner was a classmate of Woodrow Wilson at the University of Virginia. He graduated with a Bachelor of Arts from Johns Hopkins University in 1885. He then studied at the General Theological Seminary and earned his Bachelor of Divinity in 1890. He was awarded a Doctor of Divinity by the University of the South in 1899.

Ordained ministry
Horner was ordained deacon on June 1, 1890, and priest on May 24, 1891. He served his priestly ministry as principal of the Oxford School for Boys in Oxford, North Carolina, from 1890 till 1898. Horner married Eva Harker on December 14, 1892, and together had three children.

Bishop
In 1898, the General Convention of The Episcopal Church elected Horner to organize the Missionary District of Asheville. George Vanderbilt personally pledged to pay for the new bishop's position. He was consecrated missionary bishop on December 28, 1898, by the Bishop of North Carolina Joseph Blount Cheshire. When the Missionary District of Ashville was organized into the Diocese of Western North Carolina, Horner became its first diocesan bishop. He remained at the diocese until his death in Asheville on April 5, 1933.

References

1859 births
1933 deaths
Episcopal Church in North Carolina
People from Oxford, North Carolina
Johns Hopkins University alumni
General Theological Seminary alumni
Episcopal bishops of Western North Carolina